Route 85, also known as Portage Avenue, is a major arterial route in the city of Winnipeg, Manitoba, Canada.  It is one of the city's oldest and most important roads and is part of both the Trans-Canada and Yellowhead Highways.

Route description

Route 85 begins in the heart of downtown Winnipeg, at the corner of Portage and Main (Route 52), and runs southwest through the downtown to Broadway.  From Broadway to the west Perimeter Highway (PTH 100/101), it runs concurrently with the Trans-Canada Highway (PTH 1).  Route 85 ends at the Perimeter Highway interchange, however, Portage Avenue and PTH 1 continue to the official city limit and into Headingley.  Portage Avenue is also the first leg of the Yellowhead Highway from Winnipeg to Edmonton, which branches off PTH 1 on to PTH 16 near Portage la Prairie.

Route 85 is a six-lane road for its entire length and passes by major destinations such as Winnipeg Square, Bell MTS Place, Portage Place, Polo Park Shopping Centre, and the University of Winnipeg.  It is also the main link (via Route 90) between the city's downtown and airport.

Portage Avenue East, which extends approximately 200 meters southeast from the Portage and Main intersection to Westbrook Street near Shaw Park, is not part of Route 85 or the Yellowhead Highway.

History
The origin of the route stems from its use as a part of an old Red River ox cart trail.

Major intersections
Major intersections for Route 85 starting from Westbrook Street and heading west to the Perimeter Highway.

See also
Portage and Main

References

085
Winnipeg Route 085
Yellowhead Highway